Alan Fernando Rubio Fierros (born 3 February 1999) is a Mexican tennis player.

Rubio Fierros has a career high ATP singles ranking of 915 achieved on 12 September 2022. He also has a career high ATP doubles ranking of 1030 achieved on 29 August 2022.

Rubio Fierros represents Mexico at the Davis Cup, where he has a W/L record of 0–1.

References

External links

1999 births
Living people
Mexican male tennis players
21st-century Mexican people